This is a list of seasons completed by the Temple Owls men's college basketball team.

Seasons

Notes

Temple Owls

Temple Owls basketball seasons